His or HIS may refer to:

Computing 
 Hightech Information System, a Hong Kong graphics card company
 Honeywell Information Systems
 Hybrid intelligent system
 Microsoft Host Integration Server

Education 
 Hangzhou International School, in China
 Harare International School, in Zimbabwe
 Hokkaido International School, in Japan
 Hsinchu International School, in Taiwan
 Hollandsch-Inlandsche School, a Dutch school for native Indonesians in the Dutch East Indies

Science 
 Bundle of His, a collection of specialized heart cells
 Health information system
 Hospital information system
 Human identical sequence
 His-Tag, a polyhistidine motif in proteins
 Histidine, an amino acid abbreviated as His or H
 His 1 virus, a synonym of Halspiviridae
 HIS-1, a long non-coding RNA, also known as VIS1

People
 Wilhelm His Sr. (1831–1904), Swiss anatomist
 Wilhelm His Jr. (1863–1934), Swiss anatomist

Places
 His, Agder, a village in Arendal municipality in Agder county, Norway

Other uses 
 His, the possessive form of the English-language pronoun he
 H.I.S. (travel agency), a Japanese travel agency
 His, Haute-Garonne, a commune in the Haute-Garonne department, France
 B sharp, known as His in some European countries

See also
Hiss (disambiguation)